The 1st Mechanized Battalion "Sokolovi" (Lit: Falcons) (Croatian: 1. mehanizirana bojna "Sokolovi") is one of two mechanized infantry battalions within the Guards Armoured Mechanized Brigade (GOMBR) of the Croatian Army.

History 
Established in its current form, following the reorganisation of the Croatian Armed Forces in 2007, the 1st Mechanized Battalion was created with the merging of the 3rd Guards Brigade "Kune" and 5th Guards Brigade "Sokolovi".

Organisation 
Garrisoned at 132nd Brigade barracks in Našice in eastern Croatia, the battalion comprises three mechanized infantry companies, a command company, a logistics company and a fire support company.

Operations 
In the past, members of the 1st Mechanized Battalion have deployed members in support of the NATO ISAF mission in Afghanistan, as part of the Croatian Contingent (HRVCON), and to the United Nations Disengagement Observer Force (UNDOF) mission in the Golan Heights.

Equipment 
The 1st Mechanized Battalion is equipped with armoured vehicles and various infantry weapons of Yugoslav origin.

 BVP M-80A Infantry Fighting Vehicle
 BOV Armoured Personnel Carrier
 POLO M-83 anti-tank vehicle armed with 6 x AT-3 missiles
 Mercedes Benz G-Wagen
 120mm M75 Light Mortar

References 

Military units and formations of Croatia